Ives Serneels (born 16 October 1972) is a Belgian former professional footballer who is the head coach of the Belgium women's national football team.

Playing career
On 22 August 1990 Lierse SK manager Barry Hulshoff gave Serneels his debut in a match at Lokeren. Serneels remained with the club for nine seasons and was part of the 1996–97 title-winning team. After making 245 appearances in all competitions and scoring ten goals for Lierse he joined Westerlo in 1999. He then wound down his playing career with short spells at Denderleeuw and KFC Dessel Sport.

Coaching career
In March 2011 Serneels was appointed coach of the Belgium women's national football team, nicknamed the "Red Flames". The team's results improved under Serneels and national captain Aline Zeler compared him to Marc Wilmots, the successful manager of Belgium's male national team.

Honours

Player
Lierse SK
Belgian First Division: 1996–97
Belgian Super Cup: 1997
Belgian Cup: 1998–99

Westerlo
Belgian Cup: 2000-01

References

External links
 Profile at Lierse SK 
 Profile at Royal Belgian Football Association 
 

1972 births
Living people
Belgian footballers
Association football defenders
Belgian football managers
Belgian Pro League players
Belgium women's national football team managers
K. Berchem Sport players
K.V.C. Westerlo players
Lierse S.K. players
F.C.V. Dender E.H. players
People from Bonheiden
K.F.C. Diest players
Footballers from Antwerp Province
UEFA Women's Euro 2022 managers